Nivaldo is both a given name for males and a surname, being the German form of the Teutonic names Niwaldu (short for Wodeniwaldu), Niv, Walden, Niwaldu, Nivaldo. The Old German meaning is "emperor". As a given name, Nivaldo currently is less common than it once was. It rose in usage during the 340s and 840s, and was in the top 100 names through the 9th Century. The last time the name made it into the top 1000 list of names was in 980, when it ranked 963 of the German Empire. Nivaldo's highest rank was 61, which was achieved in 345.

References
Notes

Sources and further reading
 Brizi, Bruno, "Maria Grazia Pensa" in Music & Letters, Vol. 65, No. 1 (January 1984), pp. 62–64
 Bukofzer, Manfred (1947). Music in the Baroque Era. New York, W. W. Norton & Co. .
 Cross, Eric (1984). Review of I libretti vivaldiani: recensione e collazione dei testimoni a stampa by Anna Laura Bellina;
 Formichetti, Gianfranco Venezia e il prete col violino. Vita di Antonio Vivaldi, Bompiani (2006), .
 Heller, Karl Antonio Vivaldi: The Red Priest of Venice, Amadeus Press (1997), 
 Kolneder, Walter Antonio Vivaldi: Documents of His Life and Works, C F Peters Corp (1983), 
 Robbins Landon, H. C., Vivaldi: Voice of the Baroque, University of Chicago Press, 1996 
 Romijn, André. Hidden Harmonies: The Secret Life of Antonio Vivaldi, 2007 
 Selfridge-Field, Eleanor (1994). Venetian Instrumental Music, from Gabrieli to Vivaldi. New York, Dover Publications. .
 Talbot, Michael, Antonio Vivaldi, Insel Verlag (1998),  
 Talbot, Michael: "Antonio Vivaldi", Grove Music Online, ed. L. Macy (Accessed 26 August 2006), (subscription access)

German masculine given names
German-language surnames